Erika Voigt (28 November 1898 – 29 May 1952) was a Danish stage and film actress and singer. Her son, Jens Brenaa was also an actor in the mid-1970s.

Filmography 
De bør forelske Dem - 1935
Bag Københavns kulisser - 1935
Panserbasse - 1936
Sjette trækning - 1936
Mille, Marie og mig - 1937
En fuldendt gentleman - 1937
Der var engang en vicevært - 1937
Den mandlige husassistent - 1938
De tre, måske fire - 1939
Familien Olsen - 1940
Peter Andersen - 1941
Alle går rundt og forelsker sig - 1941
Tyrannens fald - 1942
Lykken kommer - 1942
Lev livet let - 1944
Op med lille Martha - 1946
Den stjålne minister - 1949
Bag de røde porte - 1951
Det gamle guld - 1951
Hold fingrene fra mor - 1951
Fodboldpræsten - 1951

External links
 
 

Danish stage actresses
Danish film actresses
20th-century Danish women singers
Olufsen Records artists
1898 births
1952 deaths
People from Randers